Bio-ship Paladin, known in Japan as , is a 1990 horizontally scrolling shoot 'em up arcade game. It was later ported to the Sega Mega Drive. While the game is essentially a standard horizontally scrolling shoot 'em up, it has an innovation that makes it unique in the genre. The player flies a spaceship (specifically, a bioship) which has the standard forward guns to be found in all horizontal scrollers, but it also possesses a weapon that can be manually targeted with a crosshair, in the same manner as in the game Missile Command. This allows the player to fire in any direction with pinpoint accuracy, and adds an extra level of strategy to the game. The game saw an almost arcade perfect port on the Sega Mega Drive. What few changes there were actually enhanced the look of the game such as added parallax scrolling backgrounds in level 2. It would eventually see a re-release after quite some time as part of the Arcade Archives series for Nintendo Switch and PlayStation 4 on August 5th, 2021 worldwide.

Story
Taking place on the planet Atlantal, a huge battleship and space fleet suddenly appears and attacks Atlantal's largest city, Delila, leaving the city in ruins. The fleet, known only as The Aggressors, continue to spread throughout the planet and further into the galaxy, past the Galegino Path, the sea of flames. To drive out and stop The Aggressors, the best twin-seat space fighter on the planet - the Paladin - is sent out; a powerful bioship that can grow larger in strength and size. The Aggressors are suggested to have come from Earth as the enemies, bosses all have vehicle names of different languages and many of the bosses are actually named after alcoholic drinks.

Gameplay

The Paladin had a variety of offenses. Unlike most shoot 'em ups, the Paladin actually had an armor gauge, meaning that the ship would not be destroyed with one hit or after brushing up against a foreground object. The ship had a semi-automatic Laser weapon that, when held down, would charge up and unleash a stronger laser blast. The ship also had the Beam weapon. Once selected, players could use a manual aiming crosshair that could be placed anywhere on the screen, allowing the player to shoot any visible enemy fighter.

The player or players had to fight through nine levels filled with clever foreground obstacles and slews of enemies. Many of the bosses had to be destroyed by first shooting off their guns, missile launchers and jets before destroying the whole ship. However, there were no Extend bonuses.

Reception 
In Japan, Game Machine listed Bio-ship Paladin on their December 15, 1990 issue as being the eleventh most-successful table arcade unit of the month.

References

External links

Arcade video games
1990 video games
Nintendo Switch games
PlayStation 4 games
Sega Genesis games
Horizontally scrolling shooters
UPL Co., Ltd games
Video games developed in Japan
Multiplayer and single-player video games
Science fiction video games
Video games set on fictional planets
Hamster Corporation games